Kilty is a rural locality (a passing loop) in Konstantinovsky Selsoviet, Kulundinsky District, Altai Krai, Russia. The population was 10 as of 2013. There is 1 street.

Geography 
Kilty is located 17 km northeast of Kulunda (the district's administrative centre) by road. Konstantinovka is the nearest rural locality.

References 

Rural localities in Kulundinsky District